Joshua Andrews (1708? – 1793) was a Welsh Baptist minister. Following studies at Bristol Academy he served as a lay preacher at Pen-y-garn. He was ordained c.1740, assisting Miles Harry with special charge of the cause at Usk for a short time before relocating to Llanwenarth.  In 1745 he was appointed minister of Olchon, and of Capel-y-ffin (twenty miles distant from Olchon), where he remained until his death following a long illness, in 1793.

References 

18th-century Welsh Baptist ministers
Year of birth uncertain
1700s births
1793 deaths